Neill Roderick McGeachy Jr. (April 20, 1942 – February 9, 2018) was an American basketball coach and college athletics administrator. Following the resignation of Bucky Waters, McGeachy was named the Duke Blue Devils men's basketball head coach in September 1973. He had previously served as the freshman team's coach in 1971–72 and as an assistant in 1972–73. McGeachy was fired after one season at the helm, compiling a record of 10–16.

McGeachy also served as an assistant coach for the Davidson Wildcats and the Wake Forest Demon Deacons. He later returned to his alma mater, Lenoir-Rhyne University, assuming the role of athletic director in 2002. He retired in 2016 after suffering a stroke in September 2015.

McGeachy died on February 9, 2018.

Head coaching record

References

External links
 Neill McGeachy at Sports-Reference.com

1942 births
2018 deaths
American men's basketball players
Basketball coaches from North Carolina
Basketball players from North Carolina
Davidson Wildcats men's basketball coaches
Duke Blue Devils men's basketball coaches
Lenoir–Rhyne Bears athletic directors
Lenoir–Rhyne Bears football players
Lenoir–Rhyne Bears men's basketball players
Sportspeople from Charlotte, North Carolina
Wake Forest Demon Deacons men's basketball coaches